The Ministry of Planning and External Cooperation is a ministry of the Government of Haiti. 

This ministry is responsible for international relations and is part of the Prime Minister's Cabinet.

Government ministries of Haiti